Wade Brookbank (born September 29, 1977) is a Canadian former professional ice hockey player. He played 127 games in the National Hockey League with the Nashville Predators, Vancouver Canucks, Boston Bruins, and Carolina Hurricanes between 2003 and 2009. He is currently a pro scout for the Chicago Blackhawks.

Playing career
Undrafted, Brookbank previously played for the Anchorage Aces of the West Coast Hockey League (WCHL), the Oklahoma City Blazers of the Central Hockey League (CHL), the Orlando Solar Bears of the International Hockey League (IHL), the Grand Rapids Griffins, Providence Bruins, Wilkes-Barre/Scranton Penguins, Binghamton Senators, Milwaukee Admirals, Norfolk Admirals and Manitoba Moose of the American Hockey League (AHL), and the Nashville Predators, Vancouver Canucks, Boston Bruins and Carolina Hurricanes of the NHL.

The 2000–01 season saw him win two professional hockey championships. He played the first half of the season with the CHL's Oklahoma City Blazers before being called up by the IHL's Orlando Solar Bears where he won the last Turner Cup before the IHL amalgamated with the American Hockey League. He then went back to the Blazers where he helped them capture the CHL championship.  His unofficial role is that of an enforcer, evident from his 43 career NHL fights, including 17 in his rookie season. Wade scored his first career NHL goal with the Canucks against Olaf Kolzig of the Washington Capitals on January 31, 2004 in a 6-1 victory. As an NHL player, he played primarily on wing.

He was traded by the Hurricanes, along with Josef Melichar and a fourth round draft pick in the 2009 NHL Entry Draft, to the Tampa Bay Lightning for Jussi Jokinen on February 7, 2009. He was then assigned to their AHL affiliate, the Norfolk Admirals to finish the 2008–09 season. A free agent during the following off-season, he signed a one-year deal with the Pittsburgh Penguins on July 31, 2009.

On July 21, 2010, Wade signed as a free agent to a one-year deal with the Rockford IceHogs of the AHL.

Following the 2013-14 season, Brookbank retired from professional hockey.  He is currently a pro scout for the Chicago Blackhawks.

Personal life
Wade's younger brother Sheldon was also a professional ice hockey player who last played for the Cleveland Monsters of the AHL. He also has an older brother, Leigh.  Leigh (Yorkton Terriers), Wade (Melville Millionaires), and Sheldon (Humboldt Broncos) are all Junior "A" alumni of the SJHL. Their father Murray was an assistant coach from 2004/05 to 2011/12 with the Humboldt Broncos.  Wade is the cousin of Geoff Sanderson, a former NHL player. In 2007, Wade was named as one of the Oklahoma City Blazers 15 greatest players.

Career statistics

Regular season and playoffs

Transactions
 Sep 1, 2000  - Signed as a free agent by Orlando Solar Bears.
 Jul 27, 2001  - Signed as a free agent by the Ottawa Senators.
 Oct 3, 2003  - Claimed by the Nashville Predators from the Ottawa Senators in the NHL Waiver Draft.
 Dec 17, 2003  - Traded to the Vancouver Canucks for future considerations.
 Dec 19, 2003  - Claimed by the Ottawa Senators off waivers from the Vancouver Canucks.
 Dec 29, 2003  - Traded to the Florida Panthers for future considerations.
 Jan 3, 2004  - Claimed by the Vancouver Canucks off waivers from the Florida Panthers.
 Jul 21, 2006  - Signed as an unrestricted free agent by the Boston Bruins.
 Dec 19, 2006  - Traded to the Pittsburgh Penguins for future considerations.
 Jul 3, 2007  - Signed as an unrestricted free agent by the Carolina Hurricanes.
 Feb 7, 2009  - Traded, along with Josef Melichar and a fourth round draft pick in the 2009 draft, to the Tampa Bay Lightning for Jussi Jokinen.
 Jul 31, 2009  - Signed as an unrestricted free agent by the Pittsburgh Penguins.
 Jul 21, 2010  - Signed as an unrestricted free agent by the Rockford IceHogs.

References

External links

1977 births
Living people
Albany River Rats players
Anchorage Aces players
Binghamton Senators players
Boston Bruins players
Canadian ice hockey defencemen
Carolina Hurricanes players
Chicago Blackhawks scouts
Grand Rapids Griffins players
Ice hockey people from Saskatchewan
Manitoba Moose players
Melville Millionaires players
Milwaukee Admirals players
Nashville Predators players
Norfolk Admirals players
Orlando Solar Bears (IHL) players
People from Lanigan, Saskatchewan
Providence Bruins players
Rockford IceHogs (AHL) players
Undrafted National Hockey League players
Vancouver Canucks players
Wilkes-Barre/Scranton Penguins players